Marco Mariani (born 14 June 1968, in Venice) is an Italian curler from Cortina d'Ampezzo, Belluno, Italy.

Mariani competed at the 2006 Winter Olympics inTurin, Italy, where he finished in 7th place. 

He is currently the coach of the Chinese women's curling team and took them to 7th place at the 2022 Winter Olympics in Beijing, China.

Personal life
Mariani is married and has one daughter.

Awards
Collie Campbell Memorial Award, 2005

References 

1968 births
Curlers at the 2006 Winter Olympics
Italian male curlers
Living people
Olympic curlers of Italy
Italian curling coaches
Sportspeople from the Province of Belluno
People from Cortina d'Ampezzo